Nayyar Ejaz (or Nayyar Ijaz) is a Pakistani film and television actor. Ejaz has been working in television industry since early 1990s. He is famous for his side roles (villain) Kali Das in the television serial Laag, Shaikh Jumbail in Dasht and Salman in Dhuwan.

Early life
He was born into a Punjabi Muslim family from Dharampura, Lahore and has 11 siblings. His father was working for Radio Pakistan and was transferred to Quetta, the city where he was born. He initially wanted to be a cricketer, and even played at first-class level, before debuting as an actor in Asghar Nadeem Syed’s first play, Zindagi Jis Ke Naam, in 1984-1985.

His elder brother is musician Ustad Salamat Ali.

Career 
Nayyar got recognition for his acting in the early 1990s with Pakistan Television Corporation in many drama serials. 

He has worked in different films, now he is being seen on different channels in some serials. 

His famous works include Dhuwan and Laag, and his negative role in drama Dasht, he played son of Sardar Nadir Jumbail played by Noor Muhammad Lashari is still praised by fans.

Filmography

Selected films

Television

References

External links 
 
 Profile: Nayyar Ejaz

Pakistani male television actors
Pakistani male film actors
Punjabi people
Living people
Year of birth missing (living people)